Gülbahar is a Turkish given name for females and may refer to:

Gülbahar Hatun, consort of Ottoman Sultan Mehmed II, and Valide Sultan as the mother of Sultan Bayezid II
Gülbahar Hatun, consort of Ottoman Sultan Bayezid II and the mother of Sultan Selim I
Mahidevran Gülbahar Hatun, consort of Ottoman Sultan Suleiman the Magnificent and the mother of Şehzade Mustafa.

Turkish feminine given names